A snake dance is a parade before or during a high school or college homecoming event.

Snake dance or Snakedance may also refer to:

Snakedance, a 1983 Doctor Who TV serial
"Snake Dance", a song by Hawkwind from Electric Tepee
"Snake Dance", a song by The March Violets
"Snake Dance", a song by Monster Magnet from Monster Magnet
"SnakeDance", a song by Ooberman from Hey Petrunko
"Snakedance", a song by The Rainmakers
"Snake Dance", a song by World Entertainment War
A dance performed by a dancer using a snake as a prop. See Odette Valery.